St Xavier's College, Nuwara Eliya is a boys' public national school in Nuwara Eliya, Sri Lanka.

See also
 List of schools in Central Province, Sri Lanka
 List of Jesuit sites

References

External links
 St. Xavier's College

1859 establishments in Ceylon
Boys' schools in Sri Lanka
Educational institutions established in 1859
National schools in Sri Lanka
Schools in Nuwara Eliya District
Former Catholic schools in Sri Lanka